The 1968 World Figure Skating Championships were held in Geneva, Switzerland from February 27 to March 3. At the event, sanctioned by the International Skating Union, medals were awarded in men's singles, ladies' singles, pair skating, and ice dance.

The ISU representative was John R. Shoemaker of USA and the ISU Technical Delegate was Elemer Tertak of Hungary.

Medal table

Results

Men

Referee:
 Karl Enderlin 

Assistant Referee:
 Dr. János Zsigmondy 

Judges:
 Franz Heinlein 
 William E. Lewis 
 Miroslav Hansenöhrl 
 Néri Valdes 
 Helga von Wiecki 
 Eva Neeb 
 Mollie Phillips 
 Masao Hasegawa 
 Yvonne S. McGowan

Ladies

Referee:
 Josef Dědič 

Assistant Referee:
 Sonia Bianchetti 

Judges:
 Sydney R. Croll 
 Hans Kutschera 
 Joan Maclagan 
 Gerhardt Bubnik 
 Carla Listing 
 Pamela Peat 
 Ferenc Kertész 
 Haruo Konno 
 Edith M. Shoemaker

Pairs

Referee:
 Alexander Gordon

Assistant Referee:
 Jakob Biedermann 

Judges:
 William E. Lewis 
 Gerhardt Bubnik 
 Carla Listing 
 Wilhelm Kahle 
 Pamela Peat 
 Oskar Schubert 
 Rolf J. Steinmann 
 Sergei Vasiliev 
 Yvonne S. McGowan

Ice dance

Referee:
 Henri Meudec 

Assistant Referee:
 Emil Skákala 

Judges:
 Frances Gunn 
 Miroslav Hasenöhrl 
 Lysiane Lauret 
 Terese Birke 
 Willi Wernz 
 Mollie Phillips 
 Ferenc Kertész 
 Margrit Rellstab 
 Edith M. Shoemaker

Sources
 Result list provided by the ISU

World Figure Skating Championships
World Figure Skating Championships
World Figure Skating Championships
1968 World Figure Skating Championships
International figure skating competitions hosted by Switzerland
Sports competitions in Geneva
20th century in Geneva
World Figure Skating Championships
World Figure Skating Championships